John G. Bestman (born December 1, 1939, in Liberia) is a Liberian politician and administrator who twice served as Minister of Finance, from 1987 to 1988 and again in 1999. He also served as minister of telecommunication and postage as well as governor of the Central Bank of Liberia. In 2005, Bestman managed Ellen Johnson Sirleaf's success presidential campaign, which saw her become the first African female president. Bestman also is member of the board of the Central Bank and adviser to the president.

References

Living people
1939 births
Finance Ministers of Liberia
Ministers of Posts and Telecommunications (Liberia)
Place of birth missing (living people)